Trojden I (1284/86 – 13 March 1341), was a Polish prince, member of the House of Piast, Duke of Czersk after 1310, ruler over Warsaw and Liw after 1313, regent of Płock during 1336–1340.

He was the second son of Bolesław II of Płock and his first wife Gaudemantė (Sophia), the daughter of Grand Duke Traidenis of Lithuania. He was named after his maternal grandfather.

Life 

In 1310, when his father was still alive Trojden I received the district of region Czersk. When his father died in 1313, he further received the districts of Warsaw and Liw in addition to his duchy, which made him ruler over all the eastern Masovia. This division didn't satisfy anybody and lead to a brief war between the three brothers in 1316. Apart from a brief mention in the Roczniku miechowskim, the exact details of this conflict are unknown.

Initially Trojden I maintained excellent relations with Władysław I Łokietek. Thanks to his intervention, in ca. 1309/10 Trojden I could married Maria, daughter of Yuri I, King of Halych-Volhynia. Thanks to this union, when in 1323 became extinct the royal Rurikid dynasty in Halych-Volhynia, and thanks to the help of Władysław I, Trojden I was able to put into the throne his own oldest son Bolesław, who assumed the name Yuri II (in honour of his maternal grandfather).

In 1325 Trojden I and Siemowit I send a letter to the Pope determined the eastern border of their possession as reaching two miles from Grodno.

The aggressive policy pursued by Władysław I the Elbow-high (who wanted to reunite all the territories of Poland and Masovia) were a threat for Trojden I and his brothers, especially when Władysław I attacked and plundered Płock as a punishment for the alliance of the youngest Masovian Duke, Wenceslaus with the Teutonic Order. This event caused that on 2 January 1326 at Brodnica, Trojden I and his brothers concluded an agreement with the Teutonic Order, which led to a short conflict with Poland and its ally Lithuania.

In the following years, Trojden I together with his brothers tried to maneuver between the Polish Kingdom and the Teutonic Order. For instance, in 1329 the Dukes of Masovia supported militarily Władysław I the Elbow-high, while in 1334 they already appeared as allies of the Grand Master.

In 1339 Trojden I was again close to the Kingdom of Poland, ruled at the time by Casimir III the Great. Evidence of this was his testimony during the Polish-Teutonic trial for the seizure of land from the Piast dynasty. For unknown reasons, Trojden I didn't personally attend the trial, but sent his Chancellor Gunther as his representative.

In 1340, his eldest son Bolesław (Yuri II) was poisoned by his own subjects. Trojden I waives his right to succeed his son in Halych-Volhynia in exchange for a large sum of money paid to him by Casimir III.

Trojden I died on 13 March 1341 and is buried in the Dominican monastery in Warka, now destroyed. In 1859 his remains were moved to the Church of Our Lady of Carmel in Warka, thanks to the initiative of Piotr Wysocki, as manifestation of the growing Polish nationalism.

Marriage and Issue

Around 1309/10, Trojden I married with Maria (bef. 1293 - 11 January 1341), daughter of Yuri I, King of Halych-Volhynia. They had four children:
Bolesław (Yuri II) (1310 – 21 March 1340), became King of Halych-Volhynia.
Euphemia (1312 – ca. 11 January 1374), married Casimir I, Duke of Cieszyn.
Siemowit III (1316/25 – 16 June 1381).
Casimir I (1329/31 – 26 November/5 December 1355).

References 

1280s births
1341 deaths
Dukes of Masovia